Heather Stewart (born 28 September 1976) is an English journalist who is a special correspondent for The Guardian. She was formerly political editor of The Guardian, and before that economics editor of The Observer and before that, The Observer's business editor.

Early life and career
Stewart was born on 28 September 1976. She was educated at a state school and then studied Philosophy, Politics and Economics (PPE) at Magdalen College, Oxford, from 1995 to 1998. From 1998 to 2000 she undertook a BPhil in Philosophy at the same university. She joined HM Treasury in 2000 as a researcher.

Career
In 2001, Stewart joined The Guardian as a junior reporter, later becoming business editor of The Observer, then its economics editor. She left the post of economics editor in December 2015. In January 2016 she became political editor of The Guardian in a job share with Anushka Asthana.

Stewart presented a podcast, along with The Guardian's political correspondent Jessica Elgot, entitled The Guardian UK: Politics Weekly, in which she spoke to commentators and politicians.

On 25 February 2022, Stewart announced she would be leaving the role of political editor to become The Guardians special correspondent. In the role she will report on the British government's levelling up policy, as well as the effects of the COVID-19 pandemic and Brexit. She was replaced as political editor by Pippa Crerar.

References

1976 births
Living people
Alumni of Magdalen College, Oxford
British business and financial journalists
British political journalists
People from East Finchley
The Guardian journalists
The Observer people